The Wengia Solodorensis is the oldest Studentenverbindung (also referred as "Verbindung"; translated as student society or fraternity) at the Kantonsschule Solothurn, the cantonal college of higher academic education. The members of the "Wengia" refer to themselves as "Wengianer". The purpose of the society, true to its motto Patria, Amicitia, Scientia ("Fatherland, Friendship, Science") is set out in their charter as follows:

"Der Zweck der Wengia ist es, das wissenschaftliche Interesse ihrer Mitglieder zu fördern. Sie soll diese durch Freundschaft zu vereinigen suchen und sie anhand von Vorträgen und Diskussionen befähigen, als vorbereitete Staatsbürger ins Leben zu treten."

"The purpose of Wengia is to promote the scientific interest of its members. It should seek to unite them through friendship and, through lectures and discussions, enable them to come into life as prepared citizens."

After passing the Matura, the former active members join the Alt-Wengia (Alumni organisation). With approximately 600 living members, this forms the largest alumni association (German: Altherrenverband) amongst student societies in Solothurn and one of the largest in Switzerland.

History 
At the beginning of the 1880s there were already student groups at the Kantonsschule Solothurn as offshoots of the university corporations “Helvetia” and “Zofingia”. Their activities were banned by an executive council resolution in 1883.

In the summer of 1884 several students came together under the leadership of Bernhard Wyss and Leo Weltner with the aim of founding a new society. Probably in the memory of the former Spe-Fuxenvereinigung of “Helvetia”, the name “Wengia”, which originally went back to Niklaus Wengi, was adopted. For the cap they agreed on the green colour, which has been a symbol of the ”Radicals” in the canton of Solothurn, the ribbon was kept in the colours green-red-green. The new society should preserve the student tradition of Solothurn and educate its members based on the principles of the radical-democratic party ruling in Solothurn and Switzerland at that time.

On 7 November 1884, the Solothurn cantonal Executive council approved the statutes submitted by 15 students. The first president was Adolf Meyer v/o Storch, who passed away while he was still active, Leo Weltner v/o Streck acted as first Fux-Major. The first members had experienced activities of the former forbidden societies and were able to build on an old tradition in building the new society.

This was followed by a time the new society was tried and tested. With the admission of other student societies at the college in 1907/1908, the "Wengia" was faced with competition, whereby the relationship among the societies developed from an open struggle at the beginning to a friendly co-existence today.

Society activities were subdued during the First World War. In contrast, the “Wengia” experienced an upswing during the Second World War. With school and fraternity life restricted, members showed great interest in the course of war and put themselves at the service of the Spiritual national defence.

The "Wengia" was delayed to feel the events of 1968, but the society accepted the challenge and was very popular in the years that followed.

Today 
The motto Patria and Scientia ("Fatherland, “Science") is upheld through lectures on political or scientific topics at regular meetings and study trips. The “Wengia” cultivates radical-liberal ideas, but is politically neutral. The prospective student can practice arguing, criticizing and speaking in a casual environment. Well-known representatives from politics, science or business are often invited as speakers. In this way, the active members are able to obtain first-hand information as future citizens and get to know experienced personalities. The motto Amicitia (“Friendship”) finds its expression in the social occasions of the society such as regular tables, Kneipen, Kommersen (both ceremonial drinking and singing sessions), balls, study trips, etc. Great importance is attached to maintaining student traditions and songs.

Alt-Wengia (Alumni organisation) 
The need of the old boys for an own association became apparent early on. In 1897, after many unsuccessful attempts, a permanent alumni organisation was founded. 
The regulars tables of the “Alt-Wengia” founded in many university towns in Switzerland not only made it possible to maintain old friendships outside of Solothurn, but also give newly enrolled students the opportunity to get advice and help counteract the anonymity in today's academic life.
The great solidarity among the alumni is shown every year in November when more than 300 “Wengianer” attend the general assembly of the Alt-Wengia held in Solothurn.

Regular pub and liaison house 
For the first eight years, the Wengia did not have a regular pub. She found her first place to stay for a longer time in 1892 in the “Brasserie Schenker”. On 1 April 1946, the “Misteli” at Friedhofplatz 14 in Solothurn has been chosen as regular pub. In 1957 a Kneipkeller was installed in the former stables. In 2006, the Kneipkeller was relocated to the vaulted cellar as part of the total renovation of the property.
1986 the property was acquired by the Wengia building cooperative. In 2005 it was transferred to “Misteli AG” which is largely owned by the alumni association and its members.

Society publication 
A link between the active members and the alumni of the “Wengia” is the publication “Der Wengianer”. Started in October 1888, it has been published regularly several times a year since. Active members and Alumni are jointly responsible for the editing.

Notable members 
 Werner Kaiser (1868–1926), Executive Counsel (Member of the cantonal executive)
 Hans Affolter (1870–1936), Federal justice, Executive Counsel (Member of the cantonal Executive), National Councillor
 Hans Jecker (1870–1946), Mayor of Solothurn
 Hans Kaufmann (1871–1940), Executive Counsel (Member of the cantonal executive); Honorary member of the Alt-Wengia
 Arthur Oswald (1872–1938), Executive Counsel (Member of the cantonal executive)
 Josef Reinhart (1875–1957), Poet; Honorary member of the Alt-Wengia
 Leo Weber (1876–1969); Educationist; Honorary member of the Alt-Wengia
 Alfred Rudolf (1877–1955), Executive Counsel (Member of the cantonal executive)
 Walther Bösiger (1878–1960), Executive Counsel (Member of the cantonal executive)
 Adrian von Arx (1879–1934), Federal justice, National Councillor
 Heinrich Studer (1889–1961), Founder of the Amalthea Signum publishing company Vienna, Austria
 Eugen Bircher (1882–1956), National Councillor, Physician, Military publisher
 Robert Furrer (1882–1962), Director-General of Federal Customs Administration
 Walther Stampfli (1884–1965), Federal Councillor, National Councillor; Honorary member of the Alt-Wengia
 Oskar Stampfli (1886–1973), Executive Counsel (Member of the cantonal executive); Honorary member of the Alt-Wengia
 Hugo Meyer (1888–1958), Mayor of Olten
 Rolf Roth (1888–1985); Artist, Cartoonist, Poet; Honorary member of the Alt-Wengia
 Paul Haefelin (1889–1972), State Councillor, Mayor of Solothurn; Honorary member of the Alt-Wengia
 Eugen Dietschi (1896–1986), State Councillor, National Councillor; Honorary member of the Alt-Wengia
 Urs Dietschi (1901–1982), Executive Counsel (Member of the cantonal executive), National Councillor; Honorary member of the Alt-Wengia
 Max Petry (1904–1989); Major General, Chief of the Swiss artillery troops
 Karl Obrecht (1910–1979), State Councillor, National Councillor; Honorary member of the Alt-Wengia
 Robert Kurt (1913–1968), Mayor of Solothurn
 Paul Affolter (1917–2005); Director-General of Federal Customs Administration
 Kurt Locher (1917–1991), Director-General of the Federal tax department
 Hans Derendinger (1920–1996), Mayor of Olten; Honorary member of the Alt-Wengia
 Fritz Wermelinger (1922–2012), Major General, Chief of the Swiss artillery troops
 Max Affolter (1923–1991), State Councillor; Honorary member of the Alt-Wengia
 Charles Dobler (1923–2014), Pianist and music educator
 Hans Künzi (1924–2004), Executive Counsel (Member of the cantonal executive), National Councillor
 Eugen Lüthy (1927–1990), Lieutenant General; Commander in Chief of the Swiss armed forces
 René Baumgartner (1930–2018), Professor of Surgery and Orthopaedics
 Manfred Schwarz (1932–2000), Playwright, theatre director and actor
 Robert Piller (1935–2019), Economist, journalist, local politician, supporter of the canton and the Jura region
 Peter André Bloch (* 1936), Germanist, professor of literary studies, cultural mediator
 Hans Gerny (1937–2021); Bishop of the Christian Catholic Church of Switzerland
 Mathias Feldges (1937–2022), Executive Counsel (Member of the cantonal executive)
 Peter Schmid (* 1941), Executive Counsel (Member of the cantonal executive)
 Urs von Arx (* 1943), Professor of Theology
 Ruedi Jeker (* 1944), Executive Counsel (Member of the cantonal executive)
 Jörg Kiefer (1944–2010), Journalist, author and local politician; Honorary member of the Alt-Wengia
 Samuel Schmid (* 1947), Federal Councillor, State Councillor, National Councillor; Honorary member of the Alt-Wengia
 Marc Furrer (* 1951), First director of the Federal Office of Communications (OFCOM), Board member of the SRG SSR
 Kurt Fluri (* 1955), National Councillor, Mayor of Solothurn 
 François Scheidegger (* 1961), Mayor of Grenchen
 Hans Schatzmann (* 1962), Brigadier General, Chief of Staff of the Chief of the Armed Forces
 Christoph Neuhaus (* 1966), Executive Counsel (Member of the cantonal executive)

References 
 Jörg Kiefer et al.: Köpfe, Ereignisse, Taten. 125 Jahre Wengia Solodorensis, 1884 bis 2009. Kommissionsverlag Lüthy+Stocker, Solothurn 2009,  (online on www.wengia.ch).
 Marco Leutenegger (Hrsg.): Farbe tragen, Farbe bekennen. Begleitschrift zur gleichnamigen Ausstellung im Kant. Museum Altes Zeughaus. Solothurn 1993.
 Jörg Kiefer (Red.): 100 Jahre Wengia Solodorensis 1984. Habegger Druck und Verlag, Derendingen 1984, LCCN 84189774 (online on www.wengia.ch).
 Louis Jäggi: 75 Jahre Wengia Solodorensis, 1884–1959. Buchdruckerei und Verlagsanstalt Vogt-Schild, Solothurn 1959 (online on www.wengia.ch).
 Eugen Dietschi et al.: Festschrift zur fünfzigsten Stiftungsfeier der Wengia Solothurn 1934. Buch- und Verlagsdruckerei Vogt-Schild, Solothurn 1934 (online on www.wengia.ch).
 Max Sauser: Die Wengia Solothurn 1884–1924. Festschrift zum 40. Stiftungsfest, Zepfel’sche Buchdruckerei, Solothurn 1924 (online on www.wengia.ch).
 Paul Bloch (Red.): Die Wengia Solothurn 1884–1909, Festschrift zur 25. Stiftungsfeier, 16. und 17. Oktober 1909. Zepfel’sche Buchdruckerei, Solothurn 1909 (online on www.wengia.ch).

External links 
 Official Website of the Wengia Solodorensis
 Collection of Wengia Postcards

Individual References 

Organizations established in 1884
Student organizations established in the 19th century
Solothurn
Wengia Solodorensis
Wengia Solodorensis